Big Run is an unincorporated community on U.S. Route 250 in Marshall County, West Virginia, United States.

Unincorporated communities in Marshall County, West Virginia
Unincorporated communities in West Virginia